Xhuliano Kamberaj (also spelled Giuliano Kamberaj; born 30 May 1994) is an Albanian cyclist, who last rode for Team Beltrami–Argon 18.

Major results

2014
 National Road Championships
1st  Road race
2nd Time trial
 7th Circuito del Porto
2015
 2nd Milan–Busseto
 3rd Trofeo Gianfranco Bianchin
 4th Circuito del Porto
2017
 1st Stage 3 Tour of Albania
 9th Circuito del Porto
2018
 1st Stage 3 Tour of Albania

References

External links

1994 births
Living people
Albanian male cyclists
Competitors at the 2018 Mediterranean Games
Mediterranean Games competitors for Albania
Sportspeople from Berat